The Hip Hop Box is a four-disc compilation of Hip Hop tracks, spanning from Sugarhill Gang's "Rapper's Delight" in 1979 to 50 Cent's "21 Questions" in 2003. The compilation has been criticized for song choice, but remains one of the most definitive collections in Hip Hop.

Track listing - disc one

Track listing - disc two

Track listing - disc three

Track listing - disc four

2004 compilation albums
Albums produced by Dame Grease
Albums produced by DJ Premier
Albums produced by DJ Quik
Albums produced by Dr. Dre
Albums produced by Mike Dean (record producer)
Albums produced by RZA
Albums produced by Sean Combs
Albums produced by Timbaland
Albums produced by the Neptunes
Albums produced by Warren G
Hip hop compilation albums